Svetlana Yurievna Zaginaichenko (August 10, 1957 - November 23, 2015) was a Ukrainian solid state physicist. She studied the physical properties of carbon materials and their application to hydrogen energy storage. She was a nominee for the 2016 Nobel Prize in Chemistry for her work in studying fullerenes.

Education 
Zaginaichenko earned a physics degree with honors from Oles Honchar Dnipro National University in 1979.

In 1984, Zaginaichenko defended her dissertation on the physical properties of hexagonally-structured and interstitial alloys at Dnipro Metallurgical Institute, earning the degree of Candidate of Physical and Mathematical Sciences (which is the Soviet equivalent of a Doctor of Philosophy). Her thesis focused on hexagonal close-packed structures and developed theories for impurity solubility, interstitial atom kinetics, and magnetism of such alloys.

Career 
From November 4, 1995 until her death in 2015, Zaginaichenko was a leading researcher at the Department for Hydrogen Materials and Carbon Nanostructures at the Institute for Problems of Materials Sciences at the National Academy of Sciences of Ukraine. She was one of the founding members of the Association of Hydrogen Energy in Ukraine (AHEU), which was formed with the support of Turhan Nejat Veziroglu, the president of the International Association of Hydrogen Energy. She was also part of the organizing committee for the International Conference of Carbon Nanomaterials in Clean Energy Hydrogen Systems.

She was nominated for the 2016 Nobel Prize in Chemistry for her work in studying the physical structure of fullerenes and proving that they have three main configurations (isomers). However, she died before the 2016 announcement of the prize, so even if the prize committee had chosen to honor this contribution, the prize's rules against posthumous awards would have prevented her from winning it.

Awards 

 Yangel Award, State Space Agency of Ukraine and the Federation of Cosmonautics of Ukraine - October 1994
 Kondratyuk Medal, State Space Agency of Ukraine and the Federation of Cosmonautics of Ukraine - December 23, 1995

See also 
Fullerene
Hydrogen fuel
Turhan Nejat Veziroğlu

References

External links 
Zaginaichenko Svetlana Yu. by National Academy of Sciences of Ukraine
 Загінайченко Світлана Юріївна by Encyclopedia of Modern Ukraine

Works by Zaginaichenko, S. Yu (Svetlana Yu.) by WorldCat
Institute for Problems of Materials Science at the National Academy of Sciences of Ukraine
International Conference of Carbon Nanomaterials in Clean Energy Hydrogen Systems

Ukrainian women physicists
Condensed matter physicists
20th-century Ukrainian physicists
1957 births
2015 deaths
Oles Honchar Dnipro National University alumni
Scientists from Kyiv
Members of the National Academy of Sciences of Ukraine